Precious International School of Davao (PISD) is a private academic institution in Matina, Davao City, Philippines.

History 
Founded by Perla Pichon Kwan in June 1999  as the Davao Precious Child Academy, the school began with three faculty members, one secretary and 46 enrolees. By the 2015-2016 school year, enrolment had increased to 2000.

In 2005, the school was named "The Most Effective Private Elementary School" in Region XI by the Philippines' Department of Education. The following year, a high school campus was completed and in 2015 a preschool campus was opened.

In 2017, a senior high school opened. The school offers three tracks; the Science, Technology, Engineering and Mathematics (STEM) track; Accountancy, Business, and Management (ABM) track; and the Humanities and Social Sciences (HUMSS) track. The school is affiliated with the Davao Association of Private Schools and Administrators.

References 

Private schools in the Philippines
International schools in the Philippines
Schools in Davao del Sur
Schools in Davao City